Toxic magazine is a British comics magazine launched in September 2002 by London-based Egmont Publishing. The intention was to address the elusive boys' magazine market. The magazine's content was originally themed around gross out topics, although this has been significantly reduced over time. The magazine has proved to be extremely successful and the title continues to be published today.

Toxic is "edited" by Team Toxic, a group of creatures under the supervision of Doc Shock.

Key content strands include movies, gaming (traditional and virtual world), TV, DVD, jokes, comics, sport, cars, celebrity, competition prizes and how-to.

Initially launched as a monthly title, Toxic increased frequency to every three weeks with issue 14, then to fortnightly with issue 34.

References

External links
Official homepage

2002 establishments in the United Kingdom
Children's magazines published in the United Kingdom
Comics magazines published in the United Kingdom
British humour comics
Monthly magazines published in the United Kingdom
Biweekly magazines published in the United Kingdom
Magazines established in 2002
2002 comics debuts
Magazines published in London